Archimaga is a genus of moths belonging to the family Tortricidae.

Species
Archimaga philomina Meyrick, 1918
Archimaga pyractis Meyrick, 1905

References
tortricidae.com

Chlidanotini
Taxa named by Edward Meyrick
Tortricidae genera